The 2022 Notre Dame Fighting Irish football team represented the University of Notre Dame in the 2022 NCAA Division I FBS football season. The Fighting Irish played their home games at Notre Dame Stadium in South Bend, Indiana, and competed as an independent. The program was led by first-year head coach Marcus Freeman.

The Irish would start the season 0-2, including an embarrassing loss to Marshall Thundering Herd despite being over 20 point favorites. Despite the rough start, Notre Dame would win eight of their next ten games to finish the season. This included a memorable 35-14 win over #4 Clemson Tigers. The season would end with the Irish defeating South Carolina 45-38 in the 2022 Taxslayer Gator Bowl. This would be only the 3rd time in the last 28 seasons that the Irish would defeat another ranked team in a bowl game. Notre Dame would finish the 2022 season 9-4.

Offseason

Coaching changes
On December 2, 2021, following the departure of Brian Kelly to LSU, defensive coordinator Marcus Freeman was promoted to head coach.

The following coaches left the football program: 
 WR coach Del Alexander left for a position at Georgia Tech
 OL coach Jeff Quinn was not retained. 
 ST coach Brian Polian left for a position at LSU.
 DL coach & recruiting coordinator Mike Elston left for a position at Michigan. 
 RB coach & run game coordinator Lance Taylor left for the offensive coordinator position at Louisville.
 TE coach John McNulty left for the offensive coordinator position at Boston College.

New coaches announced in a press conference on February 17, 2022
 Harry Hiestand, rehired to coach offensive line 
 Gerad Parker, hired to coach tight ends
 Al Washington, hired to coach defensive line
 Al Golden, hired to coach linebackers and as defensive coordinator 
 Chansi Stuckey, hired to coach wide receivers
 Brian Mason, hired to coach special teams
 Deland McCullough, hired to coach running backs

Transfers in
 DL Chris Smith transferred in from Harvard.
 S Brandon Joseph transferred in from Northwestern.
 K Blake Grupe transferred in from Arkansas State.
 P Jon Sot transferred in from Harvard.

Departures
NFL
 S Kyle Hamilton (drafted by the Baltimore Ravens)
 RB Kyren Williams (drafted by the Los Angeles Rams)
 WR Kevin Austin Jr. (signed with the Jacksonville Jaguars)
 QB Jack Coan (signed with the Indianapolis Colts)
 DL Kurt Hinish (signed with the Houston Texans)
 LB Isaiah Pryor (signed with the New Orleans Saints)
 DL Myron Tagovailoa-Amosa (signed with the Las Vegas Raiders)
 LB Drew White (signed with the Washington Commanders)
 K Jonathan Doerer (invited to New York Giants minicamp)
 OL Cain Madden (invited to New York Giants minicamp)
Transfers out
 QB Brendan Clark transferred to Old Dominion
 RB C'Bo Flemister transferred to Pittsburgh
 WR Lawrence Keys III transferred to Tulane
 TE George Takacs transferred to Boston College
 OL Quinn Carroll transferred to Minnesota
 LB Shayne Simon transferred to Pittsburgh
 LB Paul Moala transferred to Idaho
 CB JoJo Johnson transferred to Iowa Western Community College
 CB Caleb Offord transferred to Buffalo
 S K. J. Wallace transferred to Georgia Tech
 S Litchfield Ajavon transferred to Rice
 S Khari Gee transferred to Georgia Tech
 K Harrison Leonard transferred to Rhode Island
 P Jay Bramblett transferred to LSU
Other
 DL Kahanu Kia (Mormon missionary)
 OL John Dirksen (retired from football)

Schedule
Notre Dame announced and finalized the 2022 football schedule on December 7, 2021.

Personnel

Game summaries

at No. 2 Ohio State

vs Marshall

vs California

at North Carolina

vs. No. 16 BYU

vs Stanford

vs UNLV

at No. 16 Syracuse

vs No. 4 Clemson

vs Navy

vs Boston College

at No. 6 USC

vs No. 19 South Carolina (Gator Bowl)

Rankings

References

Notre Dame
Notre Dame Fighting Irish football seasons
Gator Bowl champion seasons
Notre Dame Fighting Irish football